Algerian men's national goalball team is the men's national team of Algeria.  Goalball is a team sport designed specifically for athletes with a vision impairment.  The team takes part in international goalball competitions.

Paralympic Games

1992 Barcelona 

The team competed in the 1992 Summer Paralympics, from 3 to 14 September 1992, in the Pavelló de la Vall d'Hebron indoor stadium, Barcelona, Spain.  There were twelve men's and eight women's teams.  The team came 12th.

2012 London 

The team competed in the 2012 Summer Paralympics from 30 August to 7 September 2012, in the Copper Box Arena, London, England.  There were twelve men's and ten women's teams (an increase of two more women's teams from past years).

The playing team consisted of Firas Bentria, Abdelhalim Larbi, Imad Eddine Godmane, Mohamed Ouali, Mohamed Mokrane, and Ishak Boutaleb.

 Group B

 Quarter-finals

2016 Rio de Janeiro 

Algeria's men entered the tournament ranked 12th in the world.

2020 Tokyo 

The team competed in the 2020 Summer Paralympics, with competition from Wednesday 25 August to finals on Friday 3 September 2021, in the Makuhari Messe arena, Chiba, Tokyo, Japan.

Round-robin

World Championships

1998 Madrid 

The team competed in the 1998 World Championships, in Madrid, Spain.  There were sixteen men's and eleven women's teams.  They finished fifteenth overall.

2002 Rio de Janeiro  

The team competed in the 2002 World Championships, in Rio de Janeiro, Brazil, from 30 August 2002 to 8 September 2002.  There were fourteen men's and ten women's teams.  They finished twelfth overall.

2006 Spartanburg  

The team competed in the 2006 World Championships, in July 2006, in Spartanburg, South Carolina, United States of America.  There were sixteen men's and thirteen women's teams.  They finished twelfth in the overall standings.

2010 Sheffield 

The team competed in the 2010 World Championships, from 20 to 25 June 2010, in Sheffield, England. There were sixteen men's and twelve women's teams.  They finished seventh overall.

2014 Espoo  

The team competed in the 2014 World Championships from 30 June to 5 July 2014, in Espoo, Finland.  There were fourteen men's and ten women's teams.  They placed tenth overall.

2018 Malmö 

The team competed in the 2018 World Championships from 3 to 8 June 2018, at the Baltiska Hallen, Malmö, Sweden.  There were sixteen men's and twelve women's teams.  They placed eleventh in final standings.

2022 Matosinhos 

The team competed in the 2022 World Championships from 7 to 16 December 2022, at the Centro de Desportos e Congressos de Matosinhos, Portugal.  There were sixteen men's and sixteen women's teams.  They placed eighth in Pool C, and fourteenth in final standings.

IBSA World Games 

 2003 IBSA World Games were held in Quebec City, Canada . 17th
 2007 IBSA World Games were held in São Paulo, Brazil . 7th
 2011 IBSA World Games were held in Antalya, Turkey . 6th

Regional championships 

The team competes within IBSA Africa goalball region.

 African goalball championship 2013 in Nairobi, Kenya, 1st

 African goalball championship 2016 in Algiers, Algeria, 1st

 African goalball championship 2017 in Sharm el Sheikh, Egypt, 1st

2020 Port Said  

The team competed at the 2020 IBSA Goalball African Championships, from 2 and 5 March 2020, at Port Said, Egypt, against Egypt and Morocco.  This regional tournament would have been a regional championships if Cameroon, Ghana, Kenya, and Niger men's teams had attended as originally indicated.  The team placed first.

2021 Cape Coast  

The team competed at the 2021 IBSA Goalball African Championships, from Monday 6 to Friday 10 December 2021, at the University of Cape Coast Sports Complex, Cape Coast, Ghana.  This championships was a qualifier for the 2022 World Championships.  Of the six men's teams (Algeria, Cameroon, Egypt, Ghana, Kenya, Nigeria), Algeria went though undefeated.

See also 

 Disabled sports
 Algeria women's national goalball team
 Algeria at the Paralympics

References 

National sports teams of Algeria
National men's goalball teams
Algeria at the Paralympics
Goalball in Africa